Oborniki  is a town in Poland, in Greater Poland Voivodeship, about 30 km north of Poznań. It is the capital of Oborniki County and of Gmina Oborniki. Its population is 18,176 (2005).

History
Oborniki was granted town rights before 1292. Duke Bolesław the Pious founded a Franciscan monastery in Oborniki in the 13th century. It was a royal town of the Crown of the Kingdom of Poland, administratively located in the Poznań County in the Poznań Voivodeship in the Greater Poland Province of the Polish Crown. It was frequently visited by King Władysław II Jagiełło. As a result of the Second Partition of Poland in 1793, it was annexed by Prussia. In 1807 it became part of the short-lived Polish Duchy of Warsaw. In 1815 it was annexed by Prussia for the second time. The townspeople fought in the struggles for liberation of Poland, including the November Uprising, Greater Poland uprising (1848), January Uprising and the victorious post-World War I Greater Poland Uprising, as a result of which the town was integrated with the reestablished Polish state in 1919.

After the joint German-Soviet invasion of Poland, which started World War II in September 1939, the town was occupied by Germany until 1945. The first expelled Poles were former insurgents of the Greater Poland Uprising, and the expulsions were carried out in early December 1939. The expellees were held for several days in a transit camp in the nearby village of Kowanówko, where they were robbed of money and valuables, and then they were deported in freight trains to Sokołów Podlaski in the General Government (German-occupied central Poland). In 1940, a transit camp for Poles expelled from various villages in the county was operated in the town. Some of the Poles expelled in 1940 from the nearby Chodzież and Szamotuły counties were enslaved as forced labour in the town's vicinity. In August 1944, the Germans carried out mass arrests of local members of the Home Army, the leading Polish underground resistance organization.

Sights
Among the historic landmarks of Oborniki are:
 the Market Square filled with historic townhouses
 the Church of the Assumption, dating back to the 15th century
 the timber-framed Holy Cross church
 the Gothic Revival Saint Joseph Church

Cuisine
Oborniki is one of the production sites of the Greater Poland liliput cheese (ser liliput wielkopolski), a traditional regional Polish cheese, protected as a traditional food by the Ministry of Agriculture and Rural Development of Poland.

Sports
It competes in the lower leagues.

International relations

Oborniki is twinned with:
  Herk-de-Stad, Belgium
  Kobuleti, Georgia
  Lüchow, Germany

Gallery

References

External links
 Official town website 

Cities and towns in Greater Poland Voivodeship
Oborniki County
Poznań Voivodeship (1921–1939)